The Charleston Cemeteries Historic District encompasses a cluster of 23 cemeteries north of downtown Charleston, South Carolina.  Laid out on either side of Huguenin Street in the northern part of peninsular Charleston, they were laid out between 1849 and 1956, and represented a concentrated diversity in funerary art and cemetery landscape design practices.  The oldest cemetery is Magnolia Cemetery, laid out in 1849 in the then-fashionable rural cemetery style.

The district was listed on the National Register of Historic Places in 2017.

See also
 National Register of Historic Places listings in Charleston, South Carolina
 Champion and Pearson Funeral Home
 St. Michael's Churchyard, Charleston
 Coming Street Cemetery

References

Further reading
 
 

Cemeteries on the National Register of Historic Places in South Carolina
Geography of Charleston, South Carolina
1849 establishments in South Carolina
National Register of Historic Places in Charleston, South Carolina
Cemeteries in Charleston, South Carolina
Historic districts in South Carolina